Alessandra Prete (born 20 August 1996), known by her stage name Priestess, is an Italian rapper from Apulia inspired by trap. Her influences include Rihanna, Etta James, and David Bowie whose music often explores the state of modern women through naming songs after women throughout every historical era of feminism.

She was the subject of a documentary, The 4th Wave (in reference to fourth-wave feminism), directed by Savanah Leaf that premiered at the Tribeca Film Festival in 2019.

Prete's fashion efforts include the campaign Spirit Of with Foot Locker, where she was one of three artists (one each from the UK, France, and Italy) selected; Prete acted as the "Gratitude Spirit."

Discography

Studio albums
Brava (Tanta Roba, 2019)

EPs
Torno domani (Tanta Roba, Universal; 2017)
Rendez-vous (Tanta Roba, Universal; 2020)

Singles
"Amica pusher" (2017)
"Maria Antonietta / Torno domani" (2017)
"Cleopatra" (2017)
"Maria Antonietta (Re-edit)" (2018)
"Eva" (2018)
"Fata Morgana" (2018)
"Brigitte" (2019)
"Chef" (2019) with Madman
"Fata Morgana RMX" (2020)

References

1996 births
Living people
Italian rappers
Italian women singers
21st-century Italian musicians
People from Apulia